The Kreider-Reisner Aircraft Company was an American flying service and aircraft manufacturer from 1923 to 1929.

History
The Kreider-Reisner Aircraft Company was formed at Hagerstown, Maryland in 1923 as a sub-contractor. By September 1925 the company was operating a general flying service and incorporated. In 1926 it designed and built the first aircraft the Midget lightplane. The aircraft performed well in aviation competitions so the company then designed a two-seat utility biplane. It had decided it was cheaper to design and build an aircraft for use in its own flying services and the resulting aircraft was the C-2 Challenger. A smaller version was designed and built in 1928 as the C-6 Challenger. On 1 April 1929 the company was bought by the Fairchild Aircraft Company who continued production at Hagerstown and redesignated the aircraft in a Fairchild KR series. Kreider remained president, but died on 13 April 1929 in a mid-air collision. Reisner left the company shortly afterward. By 1931, Fairchild had relocated its headquarters to the Hagerstown site. In 1935, the name of the company was changed to Fairchild Aircraft Corporation.

Aircraft

References

Notes

Bibliography 

 The Illustrated Encyclopedia of Aircraft (Part Work 1982-1985), 1985, Orbis Publishing, Page 1674

External links

Defunct aircraft manufacturers of the United States
Aviation in Maryland
Historic American Engineering Record in Maryland
Manufacturing companies disestablished in 1929
American companies established in 1923
Manufacturing companies established in 1923
1923 establishments in Maryland
1929 disestablishments in Maryland